Murder on the Orient Express is a 2001 made-for-television mystery film directed by Carl Schenkel based on the 1934 novel Murder on the Orient Express by Agatha Christie, featuring Hercule Poirot. This version is set in the present day and has a smaller cast than the novel. The screenplay was written by Stephen Harrigan and the original music score was composed by Christopher Franke.

Plot
Hercule Poirot is travelling on the Orient Express. While on the journey, Poirot meets a very close friend Bouc, who works for the Compagnie Internationale des Wagons-Lits. The train is stopped when a landslide blocks the line on the second night out from Istanbul, and American millionaire Samuel Edward Ratchett is found stabbed to death the next morning.

Since no footprints are visible around the train and the doors to the other cars were locked, it seems that the murderer must still be among the passengers in Ratchett's car. Poirot and Bouc work together to solve the case. They are aided by Pierre Michel, the middle-aged French conductor of the car.

A key to the solution is Ratchett's revealed involvement in the Armstrong tragedy in the United States several years earlier, in which a baby was kidnapped and then murdered. (The fictitious Armstrong case, inspired by the real-life kidnapping of Charles Lindbergh's baby boy.)

Cast
 Alfred Molina as Hercule Poirot
 Meredith Baxter as Mrs. Caroline Hubbard
 Leslie Caron as Sra. Nina Alvarado
 Amira Casar as Helena von Strauss
 Nicolas Chagrin as Pierre Michel
 Tasha de Vasconcelos as Vera Rossakoff
 David Hunt as Bob Arbuthnot
 Adam James as William MacQueen
 Dylan Smith as Tony Foscarelli
 Peter Strauss as Mr. Samuel Ratchett
 Fritz Wepper as Wolfgang Bouc
 Kai Wiesinger as Philip von Strauss
 Natasha Wightman as Mary Debenham

Background
Burt Reynolds, Judi Dench, Lauren Bacall, Claire Bloom, Charlotte Rampling, and Sophia Loren were all originally believed to have been cast in the film. Former Stage 84 pupil, actress and later assistant director Lynsey Trousdale from Burley in Wharfedale stood in for the cast members including Alfred Molina during rehearsals At least a dozen members of Keighley Playhouse in Keighley were extras on the film, and provided their own costumes.

Filming and production
Filming started on the 6th of February 2001 in Leeds. A replica of an Orient Express buffet car was built at Horsforth's newly opened Transformer Studios, where the majority of the filming took place. Filming also took place in Kingston upon Hull, Bury, and Istanbul.

See also
 Murder on the Orient Express is a 1974 film with Albert Finney as Poirot.
 In December 2010 the series Agatha Christie's Poirot, featuring David Suchet as Poirot, aired "Murder on the Orient Express".
 In November 2017 a new film adaptation of Murder on the Orient Express starring Kenneth Branagh as Poirot was released.
 Murder Mystery is a 2019 film produced and distributed by Netflix is inspired by the book, but set on a first-class yacht  than a express locomotive, starring Adam Sandler and Jennifer Aniston as Nick and Audrey Spitz. Despite the similar plot, Murder Mystery is not a direct adaptation of the book, rather distilling and revamping the story into a contemporary setting with different characters.

References

External links
 
 
 

2001 television films
2001 films
2000s crime drama films
2001 crime thriller films
American crime drama films
Crime television films
Films about murder
Films based on crime novels
Films based on Hercule Poirot books
Films set on the Orient Express
Films set on trains
Films scored by Christopher Franke
Fiction about child murder
American drama television films
Films directed by Carl Schenkel
Films shot in Leeds
Films shot in Kingston upon Hull
Films shot in Greater Manchester
Films shot in Istanbul
2000s American films
Murder on the Orient Express